The women's artistic team all-around competition at the 1948 Summer Olympics was held at Earls Court Exhibition Centre on 13 and 14 August. It was the third appearance of the event.

Competition format
The gymnastics format continued to use the aggregation format used in 1928 and 1936, the previous appearances of the event. The parallel bars, however, were replaced by the flying rings (the only time women competed using the flying rings in the Olympics). Each nation entered a team of eight gymnasts. All entrants in the gymnastics competitions performed both a compulsory exercise and a voluntary exercise on the vault and beam, and a compulsory exercise on the flying rings, with the scores summed to give a final total. Each team also performed two group exercises. The top six individual scores on each team and the two group exercises were summed to give a team all-around score. No individual medals (for either all-around or apparatus) were awarded for women.

Results

See also
 Olympic and Paralympic deaths

References

Women's artistic team all-around
1948
Women's events at the 1948 Summer Olympics